Puttarangaiah Jayapal (born 19 September 1972) is an Indian cricket umpire. He has featured as umpire in women's one day internationals and women's Twenty20 internationals.

References

1972 births
Living people
Indian cricket umpires
Place of birth missing (living people)